Tessonnières is a railway station in Tessonnières, Occitanie, France. It is on the Brive–Toulouse (via Capdenac) and Tessonnières to Albi railway lines. The station is served by TER (local) services operated by SNCF.

Train services
The following services currently call at Tessonnières:
local service (TER Occitanie) Toulouse–Albi–Rodez

References

Railway stations in Tarn (department)